Pasquia is a settlement in the province of Manitoba, Canada.

References 

Settlements in Manitoba